Eléonora Anne-Sophie Rbis Molinaro Simon (born 4 September 2000) is a Luxembourgish tennis player.

Career
Molinaro started playing tennis aged seven.

Having started the year with a WTA ranking of 822, she reached the final of the first ten tournaments she played in 2018, winning two out of four finals on the ITF Circuit and four out of six at the junior level. This resulted in her cracking the top 500 for the first time in March and being seeded sixth in her first appearance in a junior Grand Slam tournament at the French Open. She reached the quarterfinals before bowing out to eventual champion Coco Gauff.

Since November 2021, she only competed in three ITF tournaments.

Playing for Luxembourg Fed Cup team, she has win–loss records of 15–8 in singles and 4–5 in doubles in Fed Cup competition.

ITF Circuit finals

Singles: 12 (8 titles, 4 runner–ups)

Doubles: 5 (4 runner–ups, 1 cancelled)

Notes

References

External links
 
 
 

2000 births
Living people
Luxembourgian female tennis players
Sportspeople from Luxembourg City
Luxembourgian people of Italian descent
Tennis players at the 2018 Summer Youth Olympics